Qaleh Raisi (also Romanized as Qal‘eh Raīsī, Qal‘eh-ye Ra’īsī, Qal‘eh-ye Razeh, and Qal‘eh-ye Re’īsī; also known as Ghal‘eh Ra’īsī and Charusa (چاروسا), also Romanized as Chārūsā) is a town in – and the capital of – Charusa District, in Kohgiluyeh County, Kohgiluyeh and Boyer-Ahmad Province, Iran. At the 2006 census, its population was 2,604, in 491 families.

References

Populated places in Kohgiluyeh County

Cities in Kohgiluyeh and Boyer-Ahmad Province